Bismark/Kläden was a Verwaltungsgemeinschaft ("collective municipality") in the district of Stendal, in Saxony-Anhalt, Germany. The seat of the Verwaltungsgemeinschaft was in Kläden. It was disbanded on 1 January 2010.

Subdivision
The Verwaltungsgemeinschaft Bismark/Kläden consisted of the following municipalities:

Badingen 
Berkau 
Bismark
Büste 
Dobberkau 
Garlipp 
Grassau 
Hohenwulsch 
Holzhausen 
Käthen 
Kläden
Könnigde 
Kremkau 
Meßdorf 
Querstedt 
Schäplitz 
Schernikau 
Schinne 
Schorstedt 
Steinfeld 

Former Verwaltungsgemeinschaften in Saxony-Anhalt